Marian Kozicki (born 5 April 1941, in Brody near Poznań) is a Polish show jumping champion, who won an Olympic silver medal in 1980.

Olympic Record 
Kozicki participated at the 1980 Summer Olympics in Moscow, where he won a silver medal in team jumping.

References

External links
 

1941 births
Living people
Olympic silver medalists for Poland
Equestrians at the 1968 Summer Olympics
Equestrians at the 1972 Summer Olympics
Equestrians at the 1980 Summer Olympics
Olympic equestrians of Poland
Polish male equestrians
Olympic medalists in equestrian
People from Poznań County
Sportspeople from Greater Poland Voivodeship
Medalists at the 1980 Summer Olympics